This is a list of protected areas of Yukon. The Yukon, formerly called Yukon Territory and sometimes referred to as just Yukon is the smallest and westernmost of Canada's three territories. It also is the least populated province or territory in Canada, with a population of 35,874 people as of the 2016 Census.

National parks
 Ivvavik National Park 
 Kluane National Park and Reserve
 Vuntut National Park

Territorial parks

 Coal River Springs Territorial Park
Herschel Island–Qikiqtaruk Territorial Park
Kusawa Territorial Park
 Ni'iinlii'njik (Fishing Branch) Territorial Park
 Qikiqtaruk Territorial Park
 Tombstone Territorial Park

Parks that haven't been formally established yet (declared as "parks in progress"):

 Agay Mene Territorial Park
 Asi Keyi Territorial Park
 Dàadzàii Vàn Territorial Park

Habitat protection and special management areas 

 Ch'ihilii Chìk (Whitefish Wetlands) Habitat Protection Area
 Ddhaw Ghro Habitat Protection Area
 Devil’s Elbow and Big Island Habitat Protection Area
 Ni'iinlii Njik (Fishing Branch) Wilderness Preserve and Habitat Protection Area
 Nuna K'óhonete Yédäk Tah'é (Horseshoe Slough) Habitat Protection Area
 Łύtsäw Wetland Habitat Protection Area
 Mandanna Lake
 Pickhandle Lakes Habitat Protection Area
 Tagish River Habitat Protection Area
 Ta'tla Mun Special Management Area
 Tsâwnjuk Chu (Nordenskiold) Habitat Protection Area
 Van Tat K'atr'anahtii (Old Crow Flats) Special Management Area

See also
List of Canadian provincial parks
List of National Parks of Canada

References

External links
Government of Yukon - Yukon Parks

Yukon
Protected